James Buchanan Seaton (19 March 1868 – 25 May 1938) was an eminent Anglican Bishop in the first half of the 20th century.

He was born on 19 March 1868, educated at Leeds Grammar School and matriculated at Christ Church, Oxford in 1886 where Samuel Rolles Driver had been  canon since 1883.  Seaton was  ordained in 1894. After a period as a Curate in Oswestry he was Vice-Principal of Leeds Clergy School, then Vicar of St. Bartholomew's Church, Armley.  From 1909 until 1914 he was Archdeacon of Johannesburg when he became Principal of Cuddesdon Theological College, a position he held until his appointment to the episcopate as Bishop of Wakefield in 1928. An eminent author, he died in post on 25 May 1938 aged 70. He had become a Doctor of Divinity (DD).

References

1868 births
People educated at Leeds Grammar School
Alumni of Christ Church, Oxford
Archdeacons of Johannesburg
Bishops of Wakefield (diocese)
1938 deaths
Staff of Ripon College Cuddesdon
20th-century Church of England bishops